The 1959 UC Riverside Highlanders football team represented the University of California, Riverside as an independent during the 1959 NCAA College Division football season. Led by first-year head coach Jim Whitley, UC Riverside compiled a record of 5–2. The team outscored its opponents 125 to 75 for the season. The Highlanders played home games at UCR Athletic Field in Riverside, California.

Schedule

Notes

References

UC Riverside
UC Riverside Highlanders football seasons
UC Riverside Highlanders football